Calliostoma decipiens is a species of sea snail, a marine gastropod mollusk in the family Calliostomatidae.

Description
The shell attains a height of 18 mm.

Distribution
This species occurs in the Caribbean Sea off Venezuela.

References

External links
 To Biodiversity Heritage Library (3 publications)
 To Encyclopedia of Life
 To USNM Invertebrate Zoology Mollusca Collection
 To World Register of Marine Species

decipiens
Gastropods described in 1867